The Yellowstone cutthroat trout (Oncorhynchus clarkii bouvieri) is a subspecies of the cutthroat trout (Oncorhynchus clarkii). It is a freshwater fish in the salmon family (family Salmonidae).  Native only to a few U.S. states, their original range was upstream of Shoshone Falls on the Snake River and tributaries in Wyoming, also across the Continental Divide in Yellowstone Lake and in the Yellowstone River as well as its tributaries downstream to the Tongue River in Montana. The species is also found in Idaho, Utah and Nevada.

Population threats
Their range has been reduced by overfishing and habitat destruction due to mining, grazing, and logging, and population densities have been reduced by competition with non-native brook, brown, and rainbow trout since these were introduced in the late 19th and early 20th centuries.  However, the most serious current threats to the subspecies are interbreeding with introduced rainbow trout (resulting in cutbows) in the Greater Yellowstone ecosystem, the presence of lake trout in Yellowstone and Heart lakes in Yellowstone National Park which prey upon cutthroat trout to 15 inches in length, and several outbreaks of whirling disease in major spawning tributaries.

Although lake trout were established in Shoshone and Lewis lakes in the Snake River drainage from U.S. government stocking operations in 1890, they were never officially introduced into the Yellowstone River drainage and their presence there is probably the result of accidental or illegal introductions.

See also

References

Further reading

External links
 Wyoming Fish & Game Commission website
 

Yellowstone cutthroat trout
fish of the Western United States
freshwater fish of the United States
Yellowstone cutthroat trout
subspecies